Daniela Paz Castillo Vicuña (born September 26, 1984 in Santiago) is a Chilean female pop singer and actress born in Santiago. She debuted in 2002 as a solo artist on the Chilean TV show Rojo: Fama Contra Fama. She studied four years at the Alicia Puccio Academy where she met the casting crew for the TV show Rojo. Although she did not win first place in the singer talent contest, she became very popular due to her voice.

She released her first studio album on November 23, 2003 entitled Daniela Castillo under the Warner label. The album was a success, achieving triple Gold and double Platinum certification in Chile.

In July 2006, she starred in the movie Rojo: La Película, which was released in Chile. The movie follows characters played by her and other fellow members of the show, trying to achieve their dream in the music industry.

She released her second album Obsesión on November 28, 2006, which was certified Gold in Chile.

She participated in the second season of Estrellas en el Hielo in 2008.

Discography

Albums

Singles
 "Tú Volverás" (2003)
 "Trampa de Cristal" (2004)
 "Encontrarás" (2004)
 "Dueña de mi Corazón" (2005)
 "Volver a Respirar" (2005)
 "Volar" (2006)
 "Obsesión" (2007)
 "Invencible" (2011)

References

External links
Daniela Castillo Official website

1984 births
Living people
Actresses from Santiago
21st-century Chilean women singers
Chilean pop singers
Chilean rock singers
Masked Singer winners
Chilean singer-songwriters

Singers from Santiago